The 2017 TAC Cup season was the 26th season of the TAC Cup competition. The season was won by the Geelong Falcons after when Joel Amartey from the Sandringham Dragons missed after the siren, this claimed the Falcons third premiership win in its history. Geelong Falcons defeated the Sandringham Dragons by 2 points.

Ladder

Grand Final

References

NAB League
Nab League